Francis Robert Le Plastrier Warner (21 October 1937 - 7 December 2021) was an English poet, playwright, musician, and scholar. Warner received early notice for his lyrical poetry but focused most of his later literary career on Agora, a cycle of plays that explore the development of Western culture up to the late Twentieth Century. An Emeritus Fellow of St. Peter's College, Oxford, and Honorary Fellow of St. Catharine's College, Cambridge, Warner was also a noted advocate for experimental theatre, leading attempts during the 1960s and 1970s to establish a Samuel Beckett Theatre for avant garde theatre production in Oxford.

Early life 

Francis Warner was born in Bishopthorpe, Yorkshire, England, to Reverend Hugh Compton Warner and Nancy Le Plastrier Owen. After serving as vicar of Bishopthorpe from 1932-1938, Rev Warner became vicar of St Martin of Tours in Epsom in 1938, an incumbency he held until his resignation in 1950 to become education secretary of the Church of England Moral Welfare Council. Rev Warner and his family lived in The Old Vicarage, Epsom, throughout World War II, an experience recalled later by Francis in the collection Beauty for Ashes: Selected Prose and Related Documents and the text of David Goode's Blitz Requiem. The elder Warner, who had become an honorary canon of Guildford Cathedral in 1948,  died in London, age 51, after a long illness, on 1 July 1956.

Francis was educated at Christ's Hospital, London College of Music, and St Catharine's College, Cambridge. Whilst at Cambridge, Warner was C.S. Lewis's last graduate student.

University career 
Francis spent much of his academic career at St Peter's College, Oxford, where he was Lord White Fellow, and Tutor in English Literature from 1965–99. After retirement, he was elected Honorary Fellow of St Catharine's College, Cambridge, and Emeritus Fellow of St Peter's College, Oxford.

Experimental Theatre in Oxford

Writing 

Warner produced several volumes of lyrical poetry early in his career and was honoured for his poetry as the recipient of the Messing Award (now known as the St. Louis Literary Award) in 1972 by the St. Louis University Library Associates. Warner began writing plays in the early 1970s, creating a body of theatrical work that would later be styled as the dramatic play cycle Agora. In addition to the plays in Agora, Warner continued writing poetry, publishing several volumes throughout his later literary years.

Early Poetry

Agora 

The dramatic cycle Agora encompasses the entirety of Warner's literary output as a dramatist. Consisting of 16 individual plays, loosely following a chronological order of action, Agora tracks the development of Western culture from ancient Greece to the present.

Musical Settings

References 

1937 births
2021 deaths
20th-century English poets
English male dramatists and playwrights
Fellows of St Peter's College, Oxford
Fellows of St Catharine's College, Cambridge